, ComIH is a director and the chairman of Tokyo Electric Power Company Holdings, Inc. (TEPCO), a semi-nationalized electric utility company responsible for causing the Fukushima Daiichi nuclear disaster, and the former chairman and president of Hitachi, Ltd., the Japanese multinational electronics and engineering conglomerate. He had worked at Hitachi for his entire business career and retired as senior adviser to the company in June 2016. On request of the Japanese government, Kawamura has served as chairman of the electric power company since June 2017.

Education
Kawamura attended the University of Tokyo, receiving a Bachelor's degree in electrical engineering in 1962.

Business career
Kawamura joined Hitachi in 1962. He rose up through the ranks, becoming general manager of the Hitachi Works (turbine and electric generator factory in Hitachi, Ibaraki) in 1992, executive of the Electric Utility Sales Operations Group in 1995, managing director of the Power Group in 1997, and vice president in 1999. From 2003 to 2007, he served as Representative Executive Officer of Hitachi Solutions. In 2005, he became chairman of Hitachi Plant Engineering & Construction and Hitachi Maxell.

In 2009, he became president of the company. He served for one year until he was replaced by Hiroaki Nakanishi. He was then made chairman of the board of directors. As chairman, he hired many outside directors, making it the first board in Hitachi's history to have more outside directors than Hitachi insiders.

He has also served as the chairman of the Institute of Electrical Engineers of Japan (2004), chairman of the Communications and Information Network Association of Japan (2010), and vice chairman of the Japan Business Federation (2010).

Honours
 Commander of the Order of Prince Henry, Portugal (21 January 2014)

See also
All Nippon Airways Flight 61 — Kawamura was one of 503 passengers on board the flight.

References

1939 births
Living people
Hitachi
Japanese businesspeople
University of Tokyo alumni